MSAR can refer to:
 Macao Special Administrative Region
 Mounted search and rescue
 Microtech Small Arms Research Inc.
 Medical School Admission Requirements of the Association of American Medical Colleges (AAMC)